Bokermannohyla is a genus of frogs in the family Hylidae. It was erected in 2005 following a major revision of the Hylidae. Twenty-three species previously placed in the genus Hyla were moved to this genus named in honor of Werner Carlos Augusto Bokermann, Brazilian herpetologist. The genus is endemic to southern Brazil.

Species

References

 
Cophomantinae
Amphibian genera
Endemic fauna of Brazil
Taxa named by Jonathan A. Campbell
Taxa named by Darrel Frost